The Aoyama Gakuin Lightning football program represents the Aoyama Gakuin University in college football. They are members of the Kantoh Collegiate American Football Association.

External links
 

American football in Japan